Dhanwar Assembly constituency   is an assembly constituency in the Indian state of Jharkhand.

Members of Legislative Assembly 

 Babulal Marandi merged his party Jharkhand Vikas Morcha (Prajatantrik) into BJP.

See also
Vidhan Sabha
List of states of India by type of legislature

References
Schedule – XIII of Constituencies Order, 2008 of Delimitation of Parliamentary and Assembly constituencies Order, 2008 of the Election Commission of India 

Assembly constituencies of Jharkhand